Erethistoides infuscatus is a species of South Asian river catfish native to India and Bangladesh where it is found in the drainages of the Brahmaputra and Meghna Rivers.  This species grows to a length of  SL.

References
 

Erethistidae
Fish of Asia
Fish of India
Fish of Bangladesh
Taxa named by Heok Hee Ng
Fish described in 2006